Agonidium rufipes is a species of ground beetle in the subfamily Platyninae. It was described by Pierre François Marie Auguste Dejean in 1831.

References

rufipes
Beetles described in 1831